Panelák is a Slovak daily television series that aired from 2008 until 2017 on TV JOJ. In Slovak, panelák means "block of flats". The soap opera follows the lives of a group of people living in an apartment building.

Background
Panelák originally aired for fifteen seasons from 18 February 2008 until 17 June 2015 as a daily series, becoming the longest-running television show in Slovak history. In 2017, it was brought back for one more season upon its fifteenth anniversary, from 29 March until 30 August.
 The soap opera is loosely connected to the earlier Slovak series Susedia (Neighbours), broadcast by Markíza from 2006 until 2007, and later rebooted in 2018. The creator of Panelák, Andrej Kraus, had worked on the older show as well. The two series also shared some cast members, including Kraus himself, and Viktória Ráková. The two actors also worked together on the sitcom Kutyil s.r.o.

The show featured appearances by both domestic and international celebrities, including singers Anastacia, Celeste Buckingham, Sisa Sklovská, Zuzana Smatanová, Richard Müller, and Ján Lehotský; tennis player Daniela Hantuchová; and hockey players Marek Uram and Sasu Hovi. Slovak pop rock band Desmod, who wrote the show's title song, also made an appearance.

Selected cast and characters
 Diana Mórová as Ivana Schwarzová
 Marián Miezga as Michal Bajza
 Juraj Slezáček as Prof. Emil Blichár
 Božidara Turzonovová as Jana Nitschneiderová
 Vladimír Kobielsky as Jakub Švehla
 Miroslava Partlová as Mária "Angie" Kordiaková
 Branislav Bystriansky as Imrich "Imro" Bystrický
 Ján Koleník as Marcel "Maslák" Maslovič
 Róbert Jakab as Karol Mázik
 Zuzana Mauréry as Júlia "Julka" Chutná
 Roman Luknár as Dušan "Dudko" Jančo
 Samuel Spišák as Patrik Jančo
 Zuzana Vačková as Alica Rybáriková
 Andrea Karnasová as Denisa Bačová
 Andy Kraus as Alexander "Alex" Božský
 Viktória Ráková as Agáta Fodrászová

References

External links
 Official series page on joj.sk
 

Slovak drama television series
2008 Slovak television series debuts
2000s Slovak television series
2010s Slovak television series
TV JOJ original programming